Im Sook-ja (born 1 February 1966) is a South Korean former professional tennis player.

Im featured in a total of four ties for the South Korea Federation Cup team, three in 1989 and one in 1990. She also represented South Korea in Asian Games competition and won a bronze medal in the team event at the 1990 Beijing Games.

As a professional player she featured in the occasional ITF circuit event and was runner-up at the Fayetteville USTA tournament in 1990. She reached a best singles ranking of 353 in the world.

References

External links
 
 
 

1966 births
Living people
South Korean female tennis players
Asian Games bronze medalists for South Korea
Asian Games medalists in tennis
Tennis players at the 1990 Asian Games
Medalists at the 1990 Asian Games
20th-century South Korean women